ISO 3166-2:PH is the entry for the Philippines in ISO 3166-2, part of the ISO 3166 standard published by the International Organization for Standardization (ISO), which defines codes for the names of the principal subdivisions (e.g., provinces or states) of all countries coded in ISO 3166-1.

Currently for the Philippines, ISO 3166-2 codes are defined for two levels of subdivisions:
 17 regions
 81 provinces

Each code consists of two parts, separated by a hyphen. The second part is either of the following:
 two digits: regions
 three letters: provinces

The codes for the regions correspond to the Roman numerals used to represent the regions, except the Autonomous Region in Muslim Mindanao, the Cordillera Administrative Region, Mimaropa, and the National Capital Region, which do not use Roman numerals for representation purposes.

The codes for the provinces of Cotabato and Davao de Oro are assigned based on their former names, North Cotabato and Compostela Valley respectively.

Current codes 
Subdivision names are listed as in the ISO 3166-2 standard published by the ISO 3166 Maintenance Agency (ISO 3166/MA).

ISO 639-1 codes are used to represent subdivision names in the following administrative languages:
 (en): English
 (tl): Tagalog

Click on the button in the header to sort each column.

Regions 

Notes

Provinces 

Notes

Changes 
The following changes to the entry have been announced by the ISO 3166/MA since the first publication of ISO 3166-2 in 1998. ISO stopped issuing newsletters in 2013.

See also 
 Subdivisions of the Philippines
 FIPS region codes of the Philippines

Sources 
 ISO Online Browsing Platform: PH
 Provinces of the Philippines (statoids.com)

2:PH
ISO 3166-2
ISO 3166-2
Philippines geography-related lists